Cossulus alaicus is a moth in the family Cossidae. It is found in Kyrgyzstan.

The length of the forewings is 14–16 mm. Adults resemble Cossulus argentatus, but differs from it by a reduction of the basal yellow area on the forewings and the grey hindwings.

References

Natural History Museum Lepidoptera generic names catalog

Moths described in 2006
Cossinae
Moths of Asia